Bank of Dalian Co., Ltd. is a Chinese urban commercial bank, with its headquarters in Dalian, Liaoning Province, China. On March 28, 1998, it was established as Dalian City Commercial Bank and opened its branches only in Dalian. In 2007, it changed its name to Bank of Dalian and has since opened branches in Tianjin, Beijing, Shanghai and five other cities in China.

In 2015, China Orient Asset Management subscribed the new shares of the bank, as well as bought some assets from it. The assets itself were originally a collateral. In 2016 the bank signed a strategic agreement with sister company Dongxing Securities.

References

External links
 

Companies based in Dalian
Banks of China
China Orient Asset Management
Government-owned companies of China
Companies owned by the provincial government of China
Banks established in 1998
Chinese companies established in 1998
1998 establishments in China